= CCM Communications =

American media company

CCM Communications, now part of and operating as Salem Publishing, publishes CCM Magazine. It was founded in June 1978 to publish the namesake magazine. The name changed as the company expanded its influence into radio and the Internet.
